Michel Aglietta (born 1938) is a French economist, currently Professor of Economics at the University of Paris X: Nanterre.

Michel Aglietta is a scientific counsellor at CEPII, a member of the University Institute of France, and a consultant to Groupama. An alumnus of the École Polytechnique, from 1998 to 2006, he was a member of the Circle of economists. From 1997 to 2003, he was a member of the Council of economic analysis for the French Prime Minister. His monograph A Theory of Capitalist Regulation: The US Experience (Verso, 1976) laid the foundation for the regulation school of economics.  He is a teacher at HEC Paris.

In October 1974, Michel Aglietta published his thesis, entitled Régulation du mode de production capitaliste dans la longue période. Exemple des États-Unis (1870–1970), for his doctorate thesis at the University of Paris I: Panthéon-Sorbonne. He is also aggregate professor for the universities in Amiens, after he was administrator of the INSEE. The jury who marked his thesis consisted of Professors Raymond Barre, H. Brochier, Carlo Benetti, J. Weiller and Edmond Malinvaud. 

Michel Aglietta was one of the founders in 1976, with Robert Boyer, of the regulation school.

He is a specialist in international monetary economy, known for his work on the functions of financial markets.

Main works 
La monnaie. Entre dettes et souveraineté, 2016
Dérives du capitalisme financier, 2004
Macroéconomie financière, 1995–2005
La violence de la monnaie, with André Orléan, 1984
Régulation et crises du capitalisme, 1976–1997
La monnaie souveraine, with André Orléan, 1998

References

External links
 Personal page on the site of CEPII
 The site for regulation theory

1938 births
Living people
École Polytechnique alumni
University of Paris alumni
Marxian economists
Academic staff of the University of Paris
Writers from Chambéry
20th-century  French economists
21st-century  French economists
French people of Italian descent
Chevaliers of the Légion d'honneur
Academic staff of HEC Paris